Yashio may refer to the following places in Japan:

Yashio, Saitama, city in Saitama Prefecture
Yashio, Tokyo, district of Shinagawa